Cis is a genus of tree-fungus beetles in the family Ciidae.  There are at least 150 described species in Cis.

See also
 List of Cis species

References

Further reading

 
 
 
 
 
 

Ciidae
Ciidae genera